Roberto "Bob" Bissonnette (27 April 1981 – 4 September 2016) was a Canadian ice hockey player, as well as a singer known for his sports-themed songs and a co-owner of the Québec Capitales professional baseball team.

Sports career
Bissonnette was born in Caracas, Venezuela in 1981. He was picked for the Quebec Major Junior Hockey League (QMJHL) in Hull Olympiques becoming team captain. In 2001–2002, he was transferred to Acadie–Bathurst Titan. From 2002 onwards he played in various hockey leagues. Teams he played for include Patriots of Université du Québec à Trois-Rivières, Florida Everblades, Caron and Guay of Pont-Rouge, Summum Chiefs of Saint-Jean-sur-Richelieu and others. He stopped playing competitively in 2010.

Singing career
In 2010, Bissonnette launched a singing career releasing three albums, Recrue de l'année (2010), Les Barbes de séries (2012) and Rockstar (2014). He had a number of singles including "Mettre du tape su' ma palette" (2010), "Recrue de l'année" (2010), "Y sont toutes folles" (2010), "Hockey dans rue" and "Chris Chelios" (2011), "Les Barbes de séries" and "La machine à scorer" (2012) and "Rockstar" (2014). He operated completely independently as a musician; he had no contract with any record company, nor did he receive any subsidies from the Canadian government.

Other ventures
Bissonnette was also a minority co-owner of Québec Capitales. He performed musical numbers for five years during the regular season of Capitales.

Death
On 4 September 2016, Bissonnette died in a helicopter accident in the Flatlands, near Campbellton, New Brunswick, Canada. The crash also resulted in the death of the pilot, Frédérick Décoste. Michel Laplante, president of the Capitales, was injured in the incident.

References

External links

1981 births
2016 deaths
Acadie–Bathurst Titan players
Baseball people from Quebec
Canadian businesspeople
Canadian ice hockey players
Canadian male singers
Florida Everblades players
Hull Olympiques players
People from Caracas
Victims of helicopter accidents or incidents